Roger Williams University was a historically black college in Nashville, Tennessee. It was founded in 1866 as the Nashville Normal and Theological Institute by the American Baptist denomination, which established numerous schools and colleges in the South. Renamed for Roger Williams, the founder of the First Baptist Church in America, it became the largest Baptist college in the area for educating African Americans. It was founded in a period when Protestant mission groups sponsored numerous educational facilities for freedmen in the South.

By 1874, the college occupied a 28-acre site on a knoll near Hillsboro Pike. In 1905, its buildings were destroyed by two fires of suspicious origin, which led it to close. In 1908, it opened with a new campus at a different location. By 1922, there were only 159 students and 12 faculty members. On July 12, 1927, the decisions was made to merge with Howe Institute in Memphis. The students and teachers left for Memphis on December 29, 1929.

History

Daniel W. Phillips, a white minister and freedmen's missionary from Massachusetts, taught the first classes at what was called Nashville Institute. In 1866, the Baptist Home Mission Board sponsored selected African-American men for the first classes here, including Hardin Smith and Martin Winfield from Haywood County, Tennessee. After they returned to their home communities of Nutbush and Brownsville, respectively, they became ministers and founded several Baptist churches in the area, as well as the first school for freedmen in the county.

In 1874, the college, now known as Roger Williams University after Roger Williams, the Baptist founder of the Colony of Rhode Island and Providence Plantations and one of the first abolitionists, built a campus on a 28-acre site near Hillsboro Pike in Nashville. In 1886 it added a master's degree program. It operated here until 1905, when two suspicious fires destroyed its buildings. The campus was sold by developers posing as a Christian missionary agency, under a restrictive covenant barring African Americans from living on the land. The school closed for three years; the site is currently occupied by Peabody College (merged in 1979 with Vanderbilt University). After Baptist fundraising Roger Williams reopened in 1908 at a new location. In 1922 it had 159 students and 12 faculty.

Numerous African Americans who became teachers, ministers, doctors, and other leaders in the South were educated here throughout the 19th and early 20th centuries. Graduates included William Madison McDonald, who became an influential Republican politician in Texas.

In 1929, the university, already afflicted by financial problems made worse by the stock market crash of 1929, ceased operations; students and faculty were moved to Howe Institute, in Memphis (today LeMoyne–Owen College). The site is currently occupied by American Baptist College, a historically black college, and the World Baptist Center.

Honors
The site of the college from 1874 to 1905 near Hillsboro Pike is commemorated by a state historical marker.

Notable alumni and faculty 

 Allen Allensworth
 Newell Houston Ensley
 Betty Hill, civil rights leader
 Elijah P. Marrs, faculty in 1874
 William Madison McDonald, politician in Texas
 Inman E. Page, president of Roger Williams in 1920 and 1921.
 Randal B. Vandavall, co-founder and early trustee

References

External links

Catalogue of the Officers and Students of Roger Williams University, Nashville, Tenn.: For the Academic Year 1884-85, with the Courses of Study (1885)

Educational institutions established in 1866
Educational institutions disestablished in 1929
Defunct private universities and colleges in Tennessee
Historically black universities and colleges in the United States
Universities and colleges in Nashville, Tennessee
LeMoyne–Owen College
1866 establishments in Tennessee